The Satsumadori is a Japanese breed of chicken. It originated in Kagoshima Prefecture, in the southernmost part of the island of Kyushu in southern Japan, and was originally bred for cockfighting. The name derives from that of the former province of Satsuma, now the western part of Kagoshima Prefecture.

History 

The Satsumadori originated in Kagoshima Prefecture, in the southernmost part of the island of Kyushu in southern Japan, and was originally bred for cockfighting with steel spurs. It was designated a Natural Monument of Japan in 1943, one of seventeen breeds which have this status. the conservation status was assessed as "not at risk". and remains popular for eating

Characteristics 

The Satsumadori is bred in many colour variants. The traditional Japanese colours are: akasasa, roughly "red-hackled"; kinsasa, "golden-hackled"; kisasa, "yellow-hackled"; shirosasa, "white-hackled"; soukoku, black; and taihaku, white. In the United Kingdom it may be white, silver duckwing, gold duckwing, black or black-red; the first three of these are recognised by the Entente Européenne, while the last is not listed. 

The comb is triple in cocks, and small or non-existent in hens. Comb, face, ear-lobes and wattles are vivid red, and the eyes are gold or silver; wattles and ear-lobes may be small or entirely absent. The beak and legs are yellow, but may be darker in the black variant. Cock birds have an upright stance; the tail fans out laterally, and is held above the horizontal.

Use 

The Satsumadori was bred as a game bird for steel-spur cock-fighting, in which blades were attached to the legs in the area of the spur. This type of cock-fighting is no longer legal in Japan. The Satsumadori is kept for fancy and has become extremely popular for eating .

References

Chicken breeds originating in Japan